Váchartyán is a village and commune in the comitatus of Pest in Hungary.

References

Populated places in Pest County